The R155 road is a regional road in Ireland, linking the R147 to the N2 in County Meath via the town of Ratoath, where it crosses the R125. It passes the main entrance to Fairyhouse Racecourse near the town.

The route is 14 km long.

See also
Roads in Ireland
National primary road
National secondary road

References
Roads Act 1993 (Classification of Regional Roads) Order 2006 – Department of Transport

Regional roads in the Republic of Ireland
Roads in County Meath